Michael Cutter is a fictional character on the long-running NBC series Law & Order and its spinoff Law & Order: Special Victims Unit portrayed by Linus Roache. The character debuted in the eighteenth season premiere of Law & Order, broadcast on January 2, 2008, and remained until its series finale "Rubber Room" on May 24, 2010. The character returned to television in the thirteenth season premiere of Special Victims Unit, broadcast on September 21, 2011. He has appeared in sixty-three episodes of L&O and four episodes of SVU.

Character overview

Appearances

Law & Order
Within the continuity of Law & Order, Cutter is an Executive Assistant District Attorney, following the appointment of his predecessor Jack McCoy (Sam Waterston) to the New York County District Attorney seat vacated by Arthur Branch (Fred Dalton Thompson).

He works closely with Connie Rubirosa (Alana de la Garza), the Assistant District Attorney who had previously aided McCoy. Because of this, he has occasionally discussed McCoy with her—usually with complaints—in an attempt to understand his new boss. As evidenced by his first appearance, he is familiar with former District Attorney Arthur Branch, having apparently been in Branch's office on at least one occasion. In the episode "Executioner", he reveals that he supports the death penalty. In the L&O episode "By Perjury", he is almost murdered in the bathroom of the courthouse before being saved at the last moment by detectives Cyrus Lupo (Jeremy Sisto) and Kevin Bernard (Anthony Anderson).

In the episode "Innocence",  Cutter's former Hudson University law professor raises an issue regarding Cutter's qualification to practice law. Although he did the required undergraduate work, some of his college credits were not listed on his academic record. Due to this omission, Cutter never received an undergraduate degree, a Bachelor of Arts (BA). He attended and graduated from law school, but "perpetuated" the oversight in his application for admission to the New York State Bar Association by inaccurately claiming that he had earned a BA. Later in his career, he made the same misrepresentation when he applied for employment in the Manhattan District Attorney's Office. At the end of the episode, he receives a letter from the NYSBA's oversight department, reprimanding him but also stating that the flaw in his academic background does not prejudice any convictions he has secured as a prosecutor. The letter is published in the following day's law journal, and Cutter retains his law license and his job.

Law & Order: Special Victims Unit
In 2011, the character was introduced into the continuity of Law & Order: Special Victims Unit. In the show's universe, Cutter is promoted at the District Attorney's office to Bureau Chief ADA, where he oversees the assistant district attorneys assigned to the Special Victims Unit, most notably longtime Special Victims ADAs Alexandra Cabot (Stephanie March) and Casey Novak (Diane Neal). He is introduced as SVU's Bureau Chief in the episode "Scorched Earth", where an Italian diplomat is accused of raping a hotel maid. He works with Cabot to prosecute the case. When he tells her that they are dropping the charges, she protests his decision, saying "All I ever heard was how Mike Cutter was a crusader for justice." The case goes to trial, but the jury deadlocks on the rape charge.

In the episode "True Believers", Cutter takes the lead on a case when Cabot is unavailable where a college music student (Sofia Vassilieva) is raped at gunpoint by a drug dealer. Powerful defense attorney Bayard Ellis (Andre Braugher) uses issues of race in his defense and Cutter fails to get a guilty verdict on the case. Cutter's stronghanded tactics do not sit well with the SVU detectives, especially Detective Nick Amaro (Danny Pino), who has to be calmed by Sergeant John Munch (Richard Belzer) when Cutter asks him a question about the legality of their arrest.

Cutter is last seen in the episode "Father's Shadow", in which he prosecutes a reality show producer for raping an aspiring actress.

Personality

Legal tactics 

Roache describes his character as follows: "Sometimes he's a little dangerous; he's not necessarily a comfortable kind of guy." (...) "He cares about justice ... but he sometimes takes these leaps out-of-the-box and is kind of non-linear."

Like his predecessor, Jack McCoy, Cutter is dogged in his pursuit of justice, to the point that he is willing to bend or break rules to secure a conviction.  In L&O's "Darkness", detectives Cyrus Lupo (Jeremy Sisto) and Ed Green (Jesse L. Martin) find the likely hideout of a kidnapping victim after Lupo questions the father of a deceased suspect knowing that the father suffers from Alzheimer's and can't positively identify the store address. When the presiding judge is approached for a search warrant, he refuses to execute the warrant without further evidence such as computerized police records which, because the city is experiencing a power blackout, are inaccessible.  Gambling that he could be able to justify the actions later, Cutter tells the detectives to enter the premises anyway. In L&O's "Quit Claim," he nearly suborns perjury.

In L&O's "Tango", he realizes one of the jurors is attracted to his ADA, Connie Rubirosa (Alana de la Garza). He makes no mention of this to her, and encourages her to cross-examine witnesses in his stead. When she learns the truth, she feels Cutter "pimped [her] out to the jury". Regardless, subsequent episodes have portrayed a stable, friendly working relationship. In L&O's "Brilliant Disguise", Cutter talks about his actions while cross-examining the defendant in an attempt to elicit incriminating testimony, but claimed that he'd ordered her to instead of tricked her, much to her displeasure. By the end of the episode, he apologizes to her, which she accepts.

Cutter has been known to manipulate potential witnesses to get them to testify. Near the end of "Darkness", Cutter uses a man's daughter to make him testify. In another episode, he convinces a young girl that her relative may face serious charges unless she talks.  He even once intimidated a defendant in L&O's "Bogeyman"; by implying that he is a member of a Scientology-like group called "Systemotics," Cutter exploits the defendant's paranoia to earn a plea bargain.  In the episode "Skate or Die", Cutter pretends to be a Russian spy to provoke a mentally ill witness into headbutting him in front of Dr. Elizabeth Olivet (Carolyn McCormick) and demonstrate to her that the witness is a threat to himself and to others, leaving her no choice but to order him to take anti-psychotic medication. Cutter benefits from his provocation because the medicated witness is now able to provide coherent testimony.

In the L&O season 19 finale "The Drowned and the Saved", McCoy agrees not to bring criminal charges against Governor Donald Shalvoy (Tom Everett Scott) in exchange for testifying against his wife as part of a plea deal in a case involving prostitution and murder. After McCoy leaves the room, however, Cutter shows a piece of paper to Shalvoy purporting to contain a list of call girls the governor visited, and demands that he resign at the threat of exposing the list. Later, after Shalvoy publicly resigns, Cutter reveals that the piece of paper is blank.

In the L&O season 20 episode "Immortal", when Cutter questions Lt. Anita Van Buren (S. Epatha Merkerson), he uses her ongoing cancer treatment to win his case.  Van Buren later confronts him outside of court, accusing him of using her and violating her privacy.  At the end of the episode, the two are implied to be on non-speaking terms.

Personal life 

Cutter is pro-life.

It is implied in several episodes that Cutter has romantic feelings for Rubirosa. McCoy, despite experiencing controversy due to his own relationships with various former ADAs, appears to understand how Cutter feels. In the episode "For the Defense", it is hinted that Rubirosa is aware of his attraction, but her own feelings are left ambiguous.

Cutter's parents divorced when he was 10 years old, and since then, he has had very little contact with his father.

References

Law & Order characters
Law & Order: Special Victims Unit characters
Fictional lawyers
Television characters introduced in 2008
Crossover characters in television
American male characters in television

ja:マイケル・カッター